The Crystal Cove Historic District is a part of the Crystal Cove State Park located in Newport Beach, California. It is listed on the National Register of Historic Places encompassing  along the Southern California coast. It was listed on the National Register not only because of its significance but also because of the 46 cottages located there which were built in the 1920s and 1930s. These cottages are perfect examples of Southern California coastal development in the early 20th century and were preserved by the Crystal Cove Conservancy Alliance. Since the restoration, the cottages have been open to the public for overnight stays.

The historic district features a Ruby's Shake Shack and the "Beachcomber Cafe". The Crystal Cove Conservancy is now working on restoring the North Beach cottages.

A resident of the cottages, Martha Padve, was highly involved in a long-running case to list Crystal Cove on the National Register and to fight the State of California over tenancy matters.

The cottages at Crystal Cove were first built by the Irvine Company and were owned by movie directors and producers. Many movies have been filmed here, including Treasure Island (1918) and Beaches (1988). Many of the cottages are currently available for public vacation rentals. The district also remains a popular location for the film industry. The main cottage featured in Beaches is currently being used as a homage to Crystal Cove's Hollywood past where visitors can learn about the different movies filmed in Crystal Cove.

In 2015, Crystal Cove Alliance was featured, along with other organizations, in Laguna Beach Eco Heroes, a 30-minute documentary by The My Hero Project. The efforts of the Laguna Canyon Foundation, ECO Warrior, Laguna Bluebelt, Nancy Caruso, One World One Ocean, Pacific Marine Mammal Center, Wyland, and Zero Trash Laguna were also highlighted in the documentary.

Notes

External links

Guide to the Martha Padve Papers on the Crystal Cove Historic District. Special Collections and Archives, The UC Irvine Libraries, Irvine, California.
Guide to the Christine F. Shirley Files on Crystal Cove Historic District−. Special Collections and Archives, The UC Irvine Libraries, Irvine, California.
California State Parks: Crystal Cove State Park
Crystal Cove Historic District
Crystal Cove State Park history
Crystal Cove Beach Cottages

Historic districts on the National Register of Historic Places in California
National Register of Historic Places in Orange County, California
California Historical Landmarks